Crispian Scully CBE (1945-2017) was emeritus professor of oral medicine at University College London.

References

External links 
Profile on Research Gate

1945 births
2017 deaths
Academics of University College London
Fellows of the Royal College of Pathologists
Commanders of the Order of the British Empire